Frans Mahn (24 June 1933 – 26 March 1995) was a Dutch cyclist who was active between 1952 and 1967. He won the road race at the 1956 UCI Road World Championships, as well as the Ronde van Limburg (1953) and two national sprint titles (1966, 1967). After retiring from competitions he worked as a cycling coach with the Royal Dutch Cycling Union.

References

1933 births
1995 deaths
Dutch male cyclists
Cyclists from Amsterdam
UCI Road World Championships cyclists for the Netherlands